Burrstone Hill is a summit located in Central New York Region of New York located partially in the City of Utica and Town of Whitestown.

References

Mountains of Oneida County, New York
Mountains of New York (state)